Drizly is an online ordering and delivery platform that facilitates the delivery of alcohol from local retailers via its mobile app or website. As of December 31, 2020, the company had approximately 4,000 retail partners.

Drizly has proprietary identity document verification technology that allows drivers to verify the purchaser is of legal age to purchase alcohol.

Drizly does not take a commission and can therefore operate without liquor licenses. Instead, Drizly charges retailers a monthly fee to use its platform. Drizly does not mark up the prices of alcoholic beverages.

History
Drizly was founded by Nick Rellas, Justin Robinson, and Spencer Frazier in 2012. The company launched its service in Boston in 2013, then expanded to New York, Los Angeles, and Chicago.

In 2015, the company raised a $13 million Series A round from Polaris Partners, Suffolk Equity Partners, Cava Capital, Fairhaven Capital Partners, and First Beverage Group.

In February 2016, Drizly expanded to Edmonton and Calgary, Alberta, Canada through a partnership with Liquor Stores N.A. (LSNA).

In August 2016, the company raised a $15 million Series B round.

In July 2018, Drizly partnered with Anheuser-Busch to keep beer stocked in offices using Anheuser-Busch's Office Bud-e fridges, which use technology to automatically re-order beer when stocks run low.

In September 2021, the company added a service that specifically delivers alcohol to weddings.

In October 2021, Uber acquired the company for $1.1 billion in cash and stock.

Data breach
On July 28, 2020, Drizly announced it was the victim of a data breach that exposed the contact information of approximately 2.5 million customers. This resulted in a class action lawsuit that was settled in 2021, with each affected member receiving approximately $14.

References

External links
 

2012 establishments in Massachusetts
2021 mergers and acquisitions
Alcohol distribution retailers
American companies established in 2012
Companies based in Boston
Online retailers of the United States
Retail companies established in 2012
Shopping delivery services
Transport companies established in 2012
Transportation companies based in Massachusetts
Uber acquisitions